Kitasatospora purpeofusca is a bacterium species from the genus Kitasatospora which has been isolated from soil in Japan. Kitasatospora purpeofusca produces negamycin, aestivophoenin A, aestivophoenin B, aestivophoenin C and heptaene.

References

Further reading

External links
Type strain of Streptomyces purpeofuscus at BacDive -  the Bacterial Diversity Metadatabase

Streptomycineae
Bacteria described in 1955